This article discusses the administrative divisions of the Kingdom of Romania between 1941 and 1944. As a result of the Soviet occupation of Bessarabia and Northern Bukovina (28 June-4 July 1940), Second Vienna Award (30 August 1940) and the Treaty of Craiova (7 September 1940), territories that had previously been part of Romania were lost to the Soviet Union, Hungary and Bulgaria respectively. By September 1940 the administrative system set up in 1938 based on 'ținuturi' (regions) was disbanded and the former counties (județe) were reintroduced.

In 1941, the Romanian participation in the invasion of the Soviet Union led to the recovery of Bessarabia and Northern Bukovina. Transnistria, with the major Black Sea port of Odessa, was occupied by the Romanian Army in the autumn of 1941 and was kept under Romanian administration without being formally annexed.

As in the 1926-1938 period, Romania had two levels of administrative sub-divisions. The first level division was the County (Județ) and the City with Municipal Status (Municipiu). Counties were divided into Districts (Plasă) and Urban Districts (Oraș), which constituted the second level. The Government of Romania was represented at County level and in Bucharest municipality by a prefect and at District level by a pretor. Between 1941 and 1944 these positions were usually occupied by middle-ranking officers of the Romanian army.

The City of Bucharest had the unique status of being both a City with Municipal Status and the Capital of Romania (Capitala României) and was legally distinct from the other Counties and Cities.

In addition, the territories regained from the Soviet Union were organized into 2 large Governorates (Guvernăminte) led by high-ranking officers of the Romanian army: the Bukovina Governorate (capital at Cernăuți) and the Bessarabia Governorate (capital at Chișinău). 

Another Governorate was created in Transnistria with the capital established firstly at Tiraspol (1941–42), then moved to Odessa (1942–44). Unlike Bessarabia and Bukovina, Transnistria was not considered to be an integral part of Romania in 1941-44 and the Soviet second-level administrative divisions, the 'raions', were kept intact.

Listed below are the administrative sub-divisions of Romania in May 1942. Capitals of Counties are shown in parentheses. Note: District names coincide with the names of their capitals if not otherwise specified (e.g.:Plasa Ștefan Vodă-Rădăuți)

I. Romania proper

Județul Bihor (Beiuș)
Orașul Beiuș
Plasa Beiuș
Plasa Beliu
Plasa Ceica
Plasa Ciumeghiu
Plasa Tinca
Plasa Vașcău
Județul Arad (Arad)
Municipiul Arad
Plasa Aradu Nou
Plasa Curtici
Plasa Chișineu-Criș
Plasa Gurahonț
Plasa Hălmagiu
Plasa Ineu
Plasa Pecica
Plasa Radna
Plasa Săvârșin
Plasa Sfânta Ana
Plasa Sebiș
Plasa Șiria
Plasa Târnova
Județul Timiș-Torontal (Timișoara)
Municipiul Timișoara
Orașul Lipova
Plasa Buziaș
Plasa Chizătău
Plasa Ciacova
Plasa Deta
Plasa Gătaia
Plasa Giulvăz
Plasa Jimbolia
Plasa Lipova
Plasa Periam
Plasa Recaș
Plasa Sânnicolau Mare
Plasa Timișoara
Plasa Vinga
Județul Caraș (Oravița)
Orașul Oravița
Orașul Reșița
Plasa Bocșa Vasiova
Plasa Bozovici
Plasa Moldova Nouă
Plasa Oravița
Plasa Reșița
Plasa Sasca Montană
Județul Severin (Lugoj)
Orașul Lugoj
Orașul Caransebeș
Orașul Orșova
Plasa Balint
Plasa Birchiș
Plasa Caransebeș
Plasa Făget
Plasa Lugoj
Plasa Margina
Plasa Orșova
Plasa Sacu
Plasa Teregova
Județul Cluj-Turda (Turda)
Orașul Turda
Plasa Baia de Arieș
Plasa Câmpeni
Plasa Câmpia Turzii
Plasa Călata
Plasa Căpuș
Plasa Iara
Plasa Luduș
Plasa Mihai Viteazu
Plasa Mociu
Plasa Sărmaș
Plasa Săvădisla
Plasa Turda
Județul Hunedoara (Deva)
Orașul Deva
Orașul Brad
Orașul Hunedoara
Orașul Hațeg
Orașul Orăștie
Orașul Petroșani
Plasa Baia de Criș
Plasa Brad
Plasa Deva
Plasa Dobra
Plasa Geoagiu
Plasa Hațeg
Plasa Hunedoara
Plasa Ilia
Plasa Orăștie
Plasa Petroșani
Plasa Pui
Plasa Sarmisegetuza
Județul Alba (Alba Iulia)
Municipiul Alba Iulia
Orașul Abrud
Orașul Aiud
Orașul Sebeș
Plasa Abrud
Plasa Aiud
Plasa Alba Iulia
Plasa Ocna Mureș
Plasa Sebeș
Plasa Teiuș
Plasa Vințu de Jos
Plasa Zlatna
Județul Târnava Mică (Blaj)
Orașul Blaj
Orașul Dumbrăveni
Orașul Târnăveni
Plasa Bachnea
Plasa Blaj
Plasa Dumbrăveni
Plasa Iernut
Plasa Târnăveni
Plasa Valea Lungă
Județul Târnava Mare (Sighișoara)
Orașul Sighișoara
Orașul Mediaș
Plasa Agnita
Plasa Mediaș
Plasa Rupea
Plasa Saschiz
Plasa Sighișoara
Plasa Șeica Mare
Județul Sibiu (Sibiu)
Municipiul Sibiu
Plasa Mercurea Sibiului
Plasa Nocrich
Plasa Ocna Sibiului
Plasa Săliște
Plasa Sibiu
Plasa Tălmaciu
Județul Făgăraș (Făgăraș)
Orașul Făgăraș
Plasa Arpașu de Jos
Plasa Cincu
Plasa Făgăraș
Plasa Șercaia
Județul Brașov (Brașov)
Municipiul Brașov
Plasa Codlea
Plasa Cernatu
Plasa Feldioara
Plasa Hărman
Plasa Intorsura Buzăului
Plasa Zărnești
Județul Mehedinți (Turnu Severin)
Orașul Turnu Severin
Orașul Baia de Aramă
Orașul Strehaia
Plasa Baia de Aramă
Plasa Bâcleșu
Plasa Bălăcița
Plasa Broșteni
Plasa Cujmir
Plasa Devesel
Plasa Malovăț
Plasa Strehaia
Plasa Turnu Severin
Plasa Vânju Mare
Județul Gorj (Târgu Jiu)
Orașul Târgu Jiu
Plasa Brădiceni
Plasa Novaci
Plasa Peșteana-Jiu
Plasa Târgu Cărbunești
Plasa Târgu Jiu
Plasa Târgu Logrești
Județul Vâlcea (Râmnicu Vâlcea)
Orașul Râmnicu Vâlcea
Orașul Băile Govora
Orașul Călimănești
Orașul Drăgășani
Orașul Ocnele Mari
Plasa Bălcești
Plasa Drăgășani
Plasa Grădiștea
Plasa Horezu
Plasa Lădești
Plasa Râmnicu Vâlcea
Județul Romanați (Caracal)
Orașul Caracal
Orașul Balș
Orașul Corabia
Plasa Balș
Plasa Caracal
Plasa Corabia
Plasa Dioști
Plasa Piatra Olt
Plasa Zănoaga
Județul Dolj (Craiova)
Municipiul Craiova
Orașul Băilești
Orașul Calafat
Orașul Plenița
Plasa Amaradia
Plasa Bârca
Plasa Băilești
Plasa Brabova
Plasa Breasta
Plasa Calafat
Plasa Craiova
Plasa Filiași
Plasa Gângiova
Plasa Murgașu
Plasa Plenița
Plasa Rojiștea
Plasa Segarcea
Județul Argeș (Pitești)
Orașul Pitești
Orașul Curtea de Argeș
Plasa Costești
Plasa Curtea de Argeș
Plasa Jiblea
Plasa Pitești
Plasa Rociu
Plasa Stoicești
Plasa Titești
Județul Muscel (Câmpulung)
Orașul Câmpulung
Plasa Câmpulung
Plasa Domnești
Plasa Stâlpeni
Plasa Drăgănești-Muscel
Județul Dâmbovița (Târgoviște)
Orașul Târgoviște
Orașul Găești
Orașul Pucioasa
Plasa Bilciurești
Plasa Colanu
Plasa Găești
Plasa Ghergani
Plasa Pucioasa
Plasa Titu
Plasa Târgoviște
Plasa Valea Mare
Plasa Voinești
Județul Olt (Slatina)
Orașul Slatina
Plasa Drăgănești-Olt
Plasa Potcoava
Plasa Slatina
Plasa Spineni
Plasa Vulturești
Județul Teleorman (Turnu Măgurele)
Orașul Turnu Măgurele
Orașul Alexandria
Orașul Roșiori de Vede
Orașul Zimnicea
Plasa Alexandria
Plasa Balaci
Plasa Roșiorii de Vede
Plasa Salcia
Plasa Slăvești
Plasa Turnu Măgurele
Plasa Vârtoapele de Sus
Plasa Zimnicea
Județul Vlașca (Giurgiu)
Orașul Giurgiu
Plasa Arsache
Plasa Comana
Plasa Corbii Mari
Plasa Drăgănești-Vlașca
Plasa Giurgiu
Plasa Ghimpați
Plasa Siliștea
Plasa Vida
Județul Ilfov (București)
Municipiul București
Orașul Oltenița
Plasa Bolintin-Vale
Plasa Brănești
Plasa Budești
Plasa Buftea
Plasa Domnești
Plasa Fierbinți-Târg
Plasa Oltenița
Plasa Otopeni
Plasa Pârlita
Plasa Vidra
Județul Prahova (Ploești)
Municipiul Ploești
Orașul Câmpina
Orașul Filipești-Târg
Orașul Predeal
Orașul Sinaia
Orașul Slănic
Orașul Urlați
Orașul Vălenii de Munte
Plasa Bălțești
Plasa Câmpina
Plasa Drăgănești-Prahova
Plasa Filipești-Târg
Plasa Ploești
Plasa Poenari-Burchi
Plasa Sinaia
Plasa Slănic
Plasa Urlați
Plasa Vălenii de Munte
Județul Buzău (Buzău)
Orașul Buzău
Orașul Mizil
Plasa Buzău
Plasa Gura Dimieni
Plasa Mărăcineni
Plasa Mihăilești
Plasa Mizil
Plasa Pârscov
Plasa Pătârlagele
Plasa Pogoanele
Județul Râmnicu Sărat (Râmnicu Sărat)
Orașul Râmnicu Sărat
Plasa Râmnicu-Râmnicu Sărat
Plasa Boldu
Plasa Dumitrești
Plasa Măicănești
Plasa Plăinești
Județul Ialomița (Călărași)
Orașul Călărași
Orașul Fetești
Orașul Slobozia
Orașul Urziceni
Plasa Călărași
Plasa Căzănești
Plasa Dragoș-Vodă
Plasa Fetești
Plasa Lehliu
Plasa Slobozia
Plasa Țăndărei
Plasa Urziceni
Județul Brăila (Brăila)
Municipiul Brăila
Plasa Ianca
Plasa I.C. Brătianu
Plasa Lacu Sărat
Plasa Viziru
Județul Constanța (Constanța)
Municipiul Constanța
Orașul Carmen-Sylva
Orașul Cernavodă
Orașul Eforie
Orașul Hârșova
Orașul Mangalia
Orașul Medgidia
Orașul Ostrov
Orașul Techirghiol
Plasa Adamclisi
Plasa Cernavodă
Plasa Cogealac
Plasa Constanța
Plasa Hârșova
Plasa Mangalia
Plasa Medgidia
Plasa Negru-Vodă
Plasa Ostrov
Județul Tulcea (Tulcea)
Orașul Tulcea
Orașul Babadag
Orașul Isaccea
Orașul Măcin
Orașul Sulina
Plasa Babadag
Plasa Măcin
Plasa Sulina
Plasa Topolog
Plasa Tulcea
Județul Covurlui (Galați)
Municipiul Galați
Plasa Bujor-Târgu Bujor
Plasa Foltești
Plasa Independența
Județul Putna (Focșani)
Orașul Focșani
Orașul Mărășești
Orașul Adjud
Orașul Panciu
Orașul Odobești
Plasa Adjud
Plasa Focșani
Plasa Năruja
Plasa Odobești
Plasa Panciu
Plasa Vidra
Județul Tecuci (Tecuci)
Orașul Tecuci
Plasa Homocea
Plasa Ivești
Plasa Nicorești
Plasa Podu Turcului
Plasa Stănișești
Județul Tutova (Bârlad)
Orașul Bârlad
Plasa Ghidgeni
Plasa Murgeni
Plasa Puești
Plasa Zorleni
Județul Fălciu (Huși)
Orașul Huși
Orașul Fălciu
Plasa Epureni
Plasa Fălciu
Plasa Răducăneni
Județul Vaslui (Vaslui)
Orașul Vaslui
Plasa Codăești
Plasa Negrești
Plasa Pungești
Plasa Vaslui
Județul Bacău (Bacău)
Orașul Bacău
Orașul Moinești
Orașul Târgu Ocna
Orașul Băile Slănic
Plasa Bacău
Plasa Moinești
Plasa Parincea
Plasa Răcăciuni
Plasa Târgu Ocna
Plasa Tescani
Plasa Traian
Județul Neamț (Piatra Neamț)
Orașul Piatra Neamț
Orașul Buhuși
Orașul Târgu Neamț
Plasa Buhuși
Plasa Ceahlău
Plasa Piatra Neamț
Plasa Ștefan cel Mare
Plasa Târgu Neamț
Județul Roman (Roman)
Orașul Roman
Plasa Dămienești
Plasa Mircești
Plasa Porcești
Plasa Târgu Bâra
Județul Baia (Fălticeni)
Orașul Fălticeni
Orașul Pașcani
Plasa Boroaia
Plasa Dolhasca
Plasa Mălini
Plasa Pașcani
Județul Iași (Iași)
Municipiul Iași
Orașul Târgu Frumos
Plasa Bivolari
Plasa Buciumi
Plasa Copou-Târgu Copou
Plasa Galata
Plasa Podu Iloaiei
Plasa Târgu Frumos
Județul Botoșani (Botoșani)
Orașul Botoșani
Orașul Hârlău
Orașul Ștefănești/Ștefănești-Prut
Plasa Botoșani
Plasa Bucecea
Plasa Sulița
Plasa Ștefănești-Prut

II. Bukovina Governorate 

Județul Dorohoi (Dorohoi)
Orașul Dorohoi
Orașul Darabani
Orașul Herța
Orașul Mihăileni
Orașul Săveni
Plasa Dorohoi
Plasa Herța
Plasa Lascăr-Darabani
Plasa Săveni
Județul Suceava (Suceava)
Orașul Suceava
Orașul Solca
Plasa Cetatea Sucevei-Suceava
Plasa Solca
Județul Câmpulung (Câmpulung)
Orașul Câmpulung Moldovenesc
Orașul Gura Humorului
Orașul Vatra Dornei
Plasa Câmpulung Moldovenesc
Plasa Gura Humorului
Plasa Vatra Dornei
Județul Rădăuți (Rădăuți)
Orașul Rădăuți
Orașul Siret
Plasa Seletin
Plasa Siret
Plasa Ștefan Vodă-Rădăuţi
Județul Storojineț (Storojineț)
Orașul Storojineț
Orașul Vășcăuți/Vășcăuți pe Ceremuș
Orașul Vijnița
Plasa Storojineț
Plasa Vășcăuți
Plasa Vijnița
Județul Cernăuți (Cernăuți)
Municipiul Cernăuți
Orașul Cozmeni
Orașul Sadagura
Orașul Târgu Nistrului
Plasa Cernăuți
Plasa Cozmeni
Plasa Nistru-Târgu Nistrului
Județul Hotin (Hotin)
Orașul Hotin
Orașul Sulița/Târgu Sulița
Plasa Briceni
Plasa Chilieni
Plasa Hotin
Plasa Lipcani
Plasa Secureni
Plasa Sulița/Târgu Sulița

III. Bessarabia Governorate

Județul Soroca (Soroca)
Orașul Soroca
Plasa Climăuți-Lipnic
Plasa Florești
Plasa Nădușita-Drochia
Plasa Soroca
Județul Bălți (Bălți)
Municipiul Bălți
Orașul Fălești
Plasa Bălți
Plasa Cornești
Plasa Fălești
Plasa Glodeni
Plasa Râșcani
Județul Orhei (Orhei)
Orașul Orhei
Orașul Rezina
Plasa Chiperceni
Plasa Orhei
Plasa Rezina
Plasa Telenești
Județul Lăpușna (Chișinău)
Municipiul Chișinău
Orașul Călărași-Târg
Plasa Budești-Chişinău
Plasa Călărași-Călăraşi-Târg
Plasa Hâncești
Plasa Ialoveni
Plasa Nisporeni
Județul Tighina (Tighina)
Municipiul Tighina
Orașul Comrat
Plasa Căușani
Plasa Comrat
Plasa Cimișlia
Plasa Taraclia
Plasa Tighina
Județul Cahul (Cahul)
Orașul Cahul
Orașul Leova
Plasa Cantemir-Leova
Plasa Ion Voevod-Cahul
Plasa Ștefan cel Mare-Baimaclia
Plasa Traian-Taraclia
Județul Ismail (Ismail)
Orașul Ismail
Orașul Bolgrad
Orașul Reni
Plasa Bolgrad
Plasa Ismail
Plasa Reni
Județul Chilia (Chilia Nouă)
Orașul Chilia Nouă
Orașul Vâlcov
Plasa Chilia
Plasa Tarutino
Plasa Tătărești
Județul Cetatea Albă (Cetatea Albă)
Municipiul Cetatea Albă
Plasa Bairamcea
Plasa Liman-Cetatea Albă
Plasa Tuzla
Plasa Volintiri

IV. Transnistria Governorate

Județul Moghilău (Moghilău)
Orașul Moghilău
Orașul Șmerinca
Raionul Balchi
Raionul Copaigorod
Raionul Crasnoe
Raionul Iarișev
Raionul Sargorod
Raionul Șmerinca
Raionul Stanislavcic
Județul Tulcin (Tulcin)
Orașul Moghilău
Raionul Șmerinca
Raionul Braslav
Raionul Spicov
Raionul Trostineț
Raionul Tulcin
Județul Jugastru (Iampol)
Orașul Iampol
Raionul Cernovăț
Raionul Crijopol
Raionul Iampol
Raionul Tomaspol
Județul Balta (Balta)
Orașul Balta
Orașul Berșad
Raionul Balta
Raionul Berșad
Raionul Cicelnic
Raionul Obadovca
Raionul Olgopol
Raionul Pesceana
Raionul Savrani
Județul Râbnița (Râbnița)
Orașul Bârzula
Orașul Râbnița
Raionul Bârzula
Raionul Camenca
Raionul Codâma
Raionul Piesceanca
Raionul Râbnița
Județul Golta (Golta)
Orașul Golta
Raionul Crivoe-Oziero
Raionul Domaniovca
Raionul Golta
Raionul Liubașovca
Raionul Vradievca
Județul Ananiev (Ananiev)
Orașul Ananiev
Raionul Ananiev
Raionul Cernova
Raionul Petroverovca
Raionul Sfânta Troițca
Raionul Siraievo
Raionul Valea Hoțului
Județul Dubăsari (Dubăsari)
Orașul Dubăsari
Orașul Grigoriopol
Raionul Ciorna
Raionul Dubăsari
Raionul Grigoriopol
Raionul Ocna
Raionul Zaharievca
Județul Tiraspol (Tiraspol)
Municipiul Tiraspol
Raionul Grosulova
Raionul Razdelnaia
Raionul Selz
Raionul Slobozia
Raionul Tebricovo
Raionul Tiraspol
Județul Ovidiopol (Ovidiopol)
Orașul Ovidiopol
Raionul Balaevca
Raionul Franzfeld
Raionul Ovidiopol
Raionul Vigoda
Județul Odessa (Odessa)
Municipiul Odessa
Raionul Antono-Codincevo
Raionul Blagujevo
Raionul Ianovca
Raionul Odessa
Județul Berezovca (Berezovca)
Orașul Berezovca
Raionul Berezovca
Raionul Landau
Raionul Mostovoi
Raionul Veselinovo
Județul Oceacov (Oceacov)
Orașul Oceacov
Raionul Crasna
Raionul Oceacov
Raionul Varvarovca

References

Monitorul  al Romaniei, 1942
Buletinul Provinciei Basarabia, 1 februarie 1942
Buletinul Administratiei Provinciale a Bucovinei, vol. I (1941/1942), vol. II (1942)
Buletinul Transnistriei, vol. I (1942)

Romania in World War II
Romania geography-related lists
Romania history-related lists